Helga Landauer (Russian: Хельга Ольшванг) is a Russian director, writer and poet, based in New York City. She is best known for her work on the documentaries A Film About Anna Akhmatova and A Journey of Dmitry Shostakovich and wrote the screenplay for Crystal Swan.

Life and career
Landauer was born in 1969 in Moscow, Russian SFSR, Soviet Union. She graduated from Gerasimov Institute of Cinematography. She moved to the United States in 1996 and lives in New York City with her family.

In 1998, Landauer's debut documentary feature, Being Far from Venice, was  featured in Anthology Film Archives series and screened at IDFA.  A Journey of Dmitry Shostakovich (2006), co-directed with Oksana Dvornichenko, premiered at Carnegie Hall and Louvre Museum in Paris. A Film About Anna Akhmatova (2008), was premiered at the Baryshnikov Arts Center in New York. Her films were featured in many international film festivals, including Mar del Plata International Film Festival and Cinéma du Réel among others. She was a screenwriter for a Belarusian film, Crystal Swan.

Filmography

Books
 96th Book
 The Reed (Тростник) 
 Poetry Works (Стихотворения) 
 Versions of the Present (Версии настоящего) 
 The Three (Трое) 
 The Blue is White (Голубое это белое) 
 Scrolls (Свертки)

References

External links
 
 

Living people
1969 births
Russian documentary filmmakers
Women documentary filmmakers
Russian women poets
21st-century Russian women writers